Nahe-Glan is a Verbandsgemeinde ("collective municipality") in the district of Bad Kreuznach, Rhineland-Palatinate, Germany. The seat of the Verbandsgemeinde is in Bad Sobernheim. It was formed on 1 January 2020 by the merger of the former Verbandsgemeinden Bad Sobernheim and Meisenheim.

The Verbandsgemeinde Nahe-Glan consists of the following Ortsgemeinden ("local municipalities"):

 Abtweiler
 Auen
 Bad Sobernheim
 Bärweiler
 Becherbach
 Breitenheim
 Callbach
 Daubach
 Desloch
 Hundsbach
 Ippenschied
 Jeckenbach
 Kirschroth
 Langenthal
 Lauschied
 Lettweiler
 Löllbach
 Martinstein
 Meddersheim
 Meisenheim
 Merxheim
 Monzingen
 Nußbaum
 Odernheim am Glan
 Raumbach
 Rehbach
 Rehborn
 Reiffelbach
 Schmittweiler
 Schweinschied
 Seesbach
 Staudernheim
 Weiler bei Monzingen
 Winterburg

External links
Official website

Verbandsgemeinde in Rhineland-Palatinate